Kosmos 2452 is a Russian military communications satellite. It was launched July 6, 2009, at 1:26 UTC.

It was the second Strela 3M satellite and was launched with two other satellites.

References

Kosmos satellites
Spacecraft launched in 2009
Communications satellites of Russia
2009 in Russia